Józef Korolkiewicz (27 April 1902 – 18 November 1988) was a Polish painter. His work was part of the painting event in the art competition at the 1932 Summer Olympics.

References

1902 births
1988 deaths
20th-century Polish painters
20th-century Polish male artists
Olympic competitors in art competitions
People from Rypin County
Polish male painters